The Kingston Center Historic District is a historic district encompassing the center of Kingston, Massachusetts. At its center is the Training Green (established 1720) and Kingston Town Hall.

The district was listed on the National Register of Historic Places in 2002.

See also
National Register of Historic Places listings in Plymouth County, Massachusetts

References

Historic districts in Plymouth County, Massachusetts
Kingston, Massachusetts
National Register of Historic Places in Plymouth County, Massachusetts
Historic districts on the National Register of Historic Places in Massachusetts